The Razzie Award for Worst Actor is an award presented at the annual Golden Raspberry Awards to the worst actor of the previous year. The following is a list of nominees and recipients of that award, along with the film(s) for which they were nominated.

The category of "actor" has expanded to include the subjects of documentary films; this process has been criticised.

Winners and nominees

1980s

1990s

2000s

2010s

2020s

Multiple wins

4 wins
Sylvester Stallone
  
3 wins
Kevin Costner
Adam Sandler

2 wins
Pauly Shore
John Travolta

Multiple nominations

16 nominations
Sylvester Stallone

12 nominations
Adam Sandler

7 nominations
Kevin Costner
John Travolta 

5 nominations
Nicolas Cage
Eddie Murphy
   
4 nominations
Ben Affleck 
Johnny Depp
Arnold Schwarzenegger
Bruce Willis
   
3 nominations
Tom Cruise
Will Ferrell
Ashton Kutcher
Keanu Reeves
Burt Reynolds
Steven Seagal
Mark Wahlberg

2 nominations
Christopher Atkins
Gerard Butler 
Andrew Dice Clay
Jamie Dornan
Cuba Gooding Jr.
Larry the Cable Guy
Taylor Lautner
Mike Myers
Judd Nelson
Ryan O'Neal
Al Pacino
Robert Pattinson
Prince
Rob Schneider
Pauly Shore
Ben Stiller

References

1.Not actually "acting" performances, but the subjects of documentary films.

External links

 Official Razzie website

Actor
Film awards for lead actor